Moshi Selemani Kakoso (born 2 May 1968) is a Tanzanian CCM politician and Member of Parliament for Mpanda Rural constituency since 2010.

References

1968 births
Living people
Chama Cha Mapinduzi MPs
Tanzanian MPs 2010–2015